Cape Verdean Portuguese is the variety of Portuguese spoken in Cape Verde.

Status 
While Cape Verdean Creole is the mother tongue of nearly all the population in Cape Verde, Portuguese is the official language.  Creole is, therefore, used colloquially, in everyday usage, while Portuguese is used in official situations, at schools, in the media, etc. Portuguese and Creole live in a state of diglossia, meaning that Portuguese is usually used in formal situations, in the media, business, education, judicial system and legislature, while Creole is preferred for informal situations as a vernacular language in day-to-day life and daily activities.

Portuguese is not spoken uniformly in Cape Verde.  There is a continuum that reveals several aspects: greater or lesser education, greater or lesser exposure to Portuguese, greater or lesser frequency in Portuguese usage, etc.

There is no institution that regulates the usage of Portuguese in Cape Verde.  Nevertheless, there are some empiric concepts about what is "correct" or "incorrect" concerning the way of speaking, resulting from:
 consensual models among people that are the more educated and/or more exposed to Portuguese;
 consensual models among scholars, language teachers, etc.
 when some linguistic phenomena occur in a systematic and regular way, they are no longer considered deviance to the standard, but rather a genuine expression of a regional community;

Another interesting phenomenon is that, if by one side the Portuguese in Cape Verde has developed some specificities, on the other side, during the years of colonization the paradigmatic models were from European Portuguese, and as of today, the reference works (grammars, dictionaries, school manuals, etc.) are from Portugal.  Therefore, we are in the presence of two movements in opposite directions that happen simultaneously: on one side the Portuguese spoken in Cape Verde moves toward a development of its own characteristics, and on the other side the European Portuguese standards are still making some pressure that slows down the development of a typically Cape Verdean variety.

Other regions where this version of the Portuguese language is spoken are Portugal, Belgium, France, Luxembourg, Switzerland, the United States (especially in Massachusetts), and purportedly, Spain, specifically Catalonia (especially in Barcelona), and Northern Spain, including Galicia (see also: Cape Verdeans in Portugal, Cape Verdeans in Belgium, Cape Verdeans in France, Cape Verdean Luxembourger, Cape Verdean Swiss, Cape Verdean Americans, and Cape Verdean Spanish).

Characteristics 
The Portuguese spoken in Cape Verde is based on the European Portuguese. That's not too surprising, due to the historical relationship between the two countries, and by the fact that the language standardizing instruments (grammars, dictionaries, school manuals) are based on standards from Portugal. However, there are differences that in spite of being small are enough to set Cape Verdean Portuguese apart from European Portuguese. Despite some minor differences in the pronunciation by speakers of the northern and southern islands (see below), due to the small size of the territory one cannot say that there are dialectal divisions in the Portuguese spoken in Cape Verde, making up the Cape Verdean Portuguese on its whole a dialectal variety of Portuguese.

Phonetics 
The phonetics of the Cape Verdean Portuguese and European Portuguese are close to each other. Here are the most striking differences:
 Consonants
 In Cape Verdean Portuguese  is laminal dental , i.e., it is pronounced with the tip of the tongue touching the upper teeth. It is similar to the "l" sound in Spanish, French or German. The "l" sound in European Portuguese is velarized alveolar , i.e., it is pronounced with the tip of the tongue touching the alveolar ridge, well behind the upper teeth, with the tongue making a curve with the concavity pointing up, and the back of the tongue approaching the vellum.
  has the same variability as in European Portuguese. It is either pronounced as an alveolar trill  (more frequent in the Southern Islands) or either as an uvular trill , voiced uvular fricative  or voiced velar fricative  (more frequent in the Northern Islands).
 Vowels and diphthongs
 Unstressed initial In Cape Verde, the unstressed initial  is always pronounced close .
 Unstressed initial In Portugal the written unstressed initial  is pronounced . Probably, the natural tendency is to pronounce  (in a parallel way to the initial "o") being the pronunciation  resulting from European Portuguese pressure. Many Cape Verdean speakers clearly distinguish in the pronunciation certain word pairs: eminência \ iminência, emita \ imita, emigrante \ imigrante, elegível \ ilegível, emergir \ imergir, etc.
 Unstressed initial "e" before "s" + consonantIn Portugal the unstressed initial "e" before "s" + consonant is pronounced . In Cape Verde, this "e" is not pronounced at all, beginning the word by a voiceless palatal fricative  (estado, espátula, esquadro) or by a voiced palatal fricative  (esbelto, esganar).
 Some Cape Verdean speakers haves some trouble pronouncing the unstressed  sound, pronounced  in European Portuguese (revelar, medir, debate). This trouble is solved in two different ways:
Thus, in Cape Verde, normal, barril, cantar, beber are never pronounced normale, barrile, cantare, bebere.
 Unstressed /i/ and /u/In Cape Verde there is no dissimilation of two /i/ or /u/ like it happens in Portugal. Words like medicina, vizinho are actually pronounced me-di-ssi-, vi-zi- and not me-de-ssi-, ve-zi- like in Portugal. Words like futuro, Sofia are actually pronounced fu-tu-, su-fi- and not fe-tu-, Se-fi- like in Portugal.
 DiphthongsIn standard European Portuguese the orthographical sequence "ei" is pronounced , while the sequence "ou" is pronounced . In Cape Verde these diphthongs are pronounced as the writing suggests:  is pronounced , while  is pronounced .In the same way, the sequence  is pronounced , and not  like in standard European Portuguese.
 Stressed "e" before palatal soundsIn the same way as the previous point, the stressed "e" before the palatals ) is pronounced  and not  like in standard European Portuguese.
 The sequence  The sequence  in the word  is pronounced as an oral diphthong , rather than a nasalized diphthong .

Morphology and syntax 
In the morphology there are not big differences towards European Portuguese, being noted however the preference for some forms. The syntax reveals now and then some Creole structures that are transposed to Portuguese.
 In Portugal there are several ways for the 2nd person treatment that are expressed by  "you (familiar)",  "you (respectful)",  "sir",  "madam",  "Doctor" (or any other professional title), calling the person by its name but using the 3rd person (e.g.,  "Manuel would do this for me, please"), etc. Each of those ways corresponds to several levels of intimacy, levels of respect, hierarchy levels, etc.The treatment for the 2nd person in Cape Verde is simpler, there are only two levels:  "you" (intimacy, familiar or same age treatment) and  "you" (respectful treatment) that can be used indistinguishably from  "sir" or  "madam".
 In Creole there is no specific form for the future tense. The future in Creole is expressed with the auxiliary verb "to go". That is probably the reason why Cape Verdeans prefer using a composite form for the future in Portuguese instead of a simple form ( "I am going to do instead of  "I will do").The same happens with the conditional ( "if it rained I was not going to leave" instead of  "if it rained I wouldn’t leave").
 Frequent usage of the interrogative in the negative form, especially when someone offers something:  "Don’t you want a cup of coffee?";  "Don’t you need my help?".
 In Creole there are no definite articles. That is probably the reason why the definite article is sometimes not used. Ex.:  instead of  "Pedro went").
 The first person of the plural in the past in verbs from the first conjugation is not pronounced with an open  (even if the orthography requests that!).
 Since there is no verbal inflexion in Creole, the usage of personal pronouns is mandatory. That is probably the reason why in Cape Verdean Portuguese the omission of the personal pronouns is rare. Ex.:  more frequently than  "I go down the stairs".
 Also because the inflexion of words in Creole is weak, the word order is more rigid.  Creole does not allow the flexibility, the inversions and word order changes that Portuguese allows.In every day usage, it is not natural to a Cape Verdean speaker, when speaking Portuguese, to use inversions and word order changes. For example, what in Portugal could be said  (literally "hope I that one day there you arrive"), to a Cape Verdean speaker would be more natural to say  (literally "I hope that you arrive there one day").Nevertheless, it is not an impeachment to, at literary level, be used the flexibility mentioned before.

Lexicon and semantics 
In the lexicon and in the semantics one can notice strong influences from Creole. But the frontier between a Creole substratum in Cape Verdean Portuguese and a Creole superstratum in Cape Verdean Portuguese is not clear. Since nearly all the words in Creole originate from Portuguese, the usage of certain forms is not clear if they are Portuguese archaisms that have remained in Cape Verdean Portuguese, or if they are Creole words that were introduced in Portuguese.

In some other cases, even when speaking Portuguese, is more frequent to use a Creole word than the corresponding Portuguese one.
 Some words are specific and reveal some particularities of the fauna, the flora, the ethnography, the cuisine, the climate, etc.
  (meringue) ;
  (chilli pepper) instead of, but the word malagueta is also used in the Portuguese-speaking world;
  (guitar) same usage in Brazil, but different in Portugal;
 Other objects, ideas or expressions are expressed differently. Ex.:
 what in Portugal is called indiscriminately , in Cape Verde has several denominations accordingly to the object:  "suitcase",  "briefcase",  "purse",  "lady's handbag",  "trunk", etc.;
 on the other side, what in Portugal can be called  "overcoat",  "coat",  "jersey",  "anorak", etc., in Cape Verde is simply called ;
  is used (and not  "calculator"),  (and not  “Xerox machine”),  (and not  "ink cartridge");

 Because the closer neighboring countries of Cape Verde are francophones, in diplomatic environment or in environments more in contact with foreigners some neologisms appear, strongly rejected by scholars and purists in Cape Verde. For ex.:  (from French ),  (from French ),  meaning “address” (is it from French  or from English “address”?). However, the fact that in Creole is pronounced “tchanci” makes one believe that the usage of the word chance (in Cape Verdean Portuguese) is an Anglicism (English “chance”), and not a Gallicism (French );
 In spite of some words being used with exactly the same meaning of European Portuguese, they are also used with the meaning in Creole. Ex.:
 , rebel, unsubmissive, instead of rude;
 , desperation, instead of outrage;
 , exclamation meaning “of course!”
 , mountain, instead of rock
 , naïf, instead of innocent;
 Some meanings in Portugal are simply not known in Cape Verde. Ex.:
  is only known with the meaning of “to shake”, and not with the meaning of “to leave”;
  is only known with the meaning of “islet”, and not with the meaning of “island inhabitant”;

Orthography 
Cape Verde has participated on the works towards the elaboration of the Acordo Ortográfico — with a delegation composed of the linguist Manuel Veiga and by the writer Moacyr Rodrigues — and has ratified the document. In 1998 Cape Verde was the host of the II CPLP Summit, held in Praia, where the first “Protocolo Modificativo ao Acordo Ortográfico da Língua Portuguesa” was signed, which removed from the original text the original date of enforcement (1994). Cape Verde has ratified this document, as well as the “Segundo Protocolo Modificativo” (April 2005), being the second country (after Brazil) to complete the entire procedure for the enforcement of the Spelling Agreement.

According to Prime Minister José Maria Neves, Cape Verde is in favor of a “spell approach” between the existing variants in Portugal and Brazil and sees Portuguese as “an important tool for the development of Cape Verde”. Despite of the Spelling Agreement 1990 having become effective on October 1, 2015, in the country the rules of Spelling Agreement of 1945 continues to prevail.

See also
Guinean Portuguese
Papiamento
São Tomean Portuguese
Portuguese language in Africa
ECOWAS
RTC (Cape Verde)

References

External links
 Cátedra "Português Língua Segunda e Estrangeira" — Bibliografia sobre o Português de Cabo Verde . Cátedra de Português Língua Segunda e Estrangeira. — Bibliography on Cape Verdean Portuguese
 O Português na África – Cabo Verde. www.linguaportuguesa.ufrn.br

Portuguese dialects
Languages of Cape Verde
Portuguese language in Africa